Stereo Skyline was an American pop rock band from East Meadow, New York, which was formed in 2006, known for the song "Uptown, Get Around" first heard in The Suite Life Movie.

The group has played at The Bamboozle 2007, The Bamboozle Left 2009, The Bamboozle 2009, The 2010 Take Action Tour, The Bamboozle Roadshow 2010, released two EPs and an album, Stuck On Repeat on July 20, 2010, on Columbia Records.

History

2006-07: Formation and The Worst Case Scenario EP

In 2006, Matt Villani left the Pop Punk group, Valet Parking to form a new band, called Stereo Skyline. Villani initially played piano and synth and sang lead vocals for the band. He recruited Jay Marotta and Anthony Purpura of his former band, Aerosol, to play guitar and bass guitar, respectively, Dane Drozdzewicz to play drums and Eddie Dizura of Suddenly October to play guitar.

Soon after the formation of the first line-up, Drozdzewicz left the band and was temporarily replaced by Chris Capuano of Valet Parking/Set In Color until Purpura was moved to drums. Tom Angenbroich of Don't Fall Darling was recruited to play bass guitar and scream. Dizura also left and was replaced by his Suddenly October bandmate, Kevin Bard, who was recruited to play guitar and sing backup vocals. This remained the line-up for their first EP, The Worst Case Scenario.

The Worst Case Scenario was recorded by the producer Nick Zinnanti in his Bethpage, New York, studio and was released in 2006. The band toured around Long Island to promote its release.

In 2007, the band underwent a major line-up change. Bard became the lead vocalist. Villani became the backing vocalist, continued on piano, and picked up guitar. Purpura switched to playing synthesizer, and Rob Michelsen joined the band to play drums. The band played at The Bamboozle for the first time that year.

2007-08: Major changes and Stereo Skyline EP

Shortly after their performance at Bamboozle, the band took on the manager Jason Aron of Ozone Management (Boys Like Girls, Hey Monday, We the Kings). Aron wanted to take the band in another direction which resulted in the departure of Angenbroich and Purpura in summer 2007. As a result, Marotta switched to bass guitar and Bard maintained his role as lead singer, but also picked up guitar. The new line-up recorded and released a demo that summer.

In winter and spring 2008, the band recorded an EP called Stereo Skyline at Stadiumred in Harlem, New York. It was released in July 2008. The artwork for the EP was created by Alexander Sheldon of Match & Kerosene and was edited into its final state by Russell Heiman of Nice Guys Finish First.

2008-09: Departure of Villani and signing to Columbia Records
In September 2008, after numerous conflicts with the band, Villani was fired. He formed Set In Colour immediately after his departure with Angenbroich and Purpura, former Stereo Skyline members, along with Kenny Gallart on drums. The band continued with Bard as its new leader and recruited Brian Maddox of Scenes and Sirens to replace Villani on guitar. In November 2008, Marotta left the band for undisclosed reasons, and Maddox switched to bass guitar.

In January 2009, the band signed a publishing deal with Sony/ATV Music Publishing. In February 2009, the band was taken on by the Paradigm Booking Agency. In June 2009, the band had signed a record deal with Columbia Records. In September 2009, the band played a string of shows with Mitchel Musso and are referred to many times in the video for "Shout It" which was shot primarily at the September 9, 2009, show they played with Musso, KSM and Jimmy Robbins at the House of Blues in Boston, Massachusetts. In the video, Musso wears a Stereo Skyline bracelet.

2010: Gaining exposure and Stuck on Repeat
The band was featured in Alternative Press magazine as one of its "100 Bands You Need to Know" for 2010.

On April 26, 2010, after being the touring guitarist since January 2010, Clayton Johnson, formerly of A Bird A Sparrow and IT BOYS!, officially joined Stereo Skyline as its permanent guitarist and backing vocalist.

The band appeared on the MTV show Silent Library with Hey Monday.

The band's album, Stuck On Repeat, was released on July 20, 2010. It was produced by Blake Healy (formerly of Metro Station) and includes production and songwriting work by S*A*M and Sluggo and Adam Schlesinger. The band went on its first headlining tour to promote the album with The Audition, Cash Cash, The Downtown Fiction and Cady Groves for support from July 28 to August 21.

On November 1, 2010, the band performed live for Good Day New York.

2011: Departure of Maddox and Johnson and The Good Life
In spring 2011, Stereo Skyline set out on "Tourantula!" supporting Family Force 5. Their song "Uptown, Get Around" was played at the beginning of The Suite Life Movie.

On May 21, 2011, Johnson and Maddox announced that they had left Stereo Skyline to "explore other adventures in music and create a 'secret' project together". The secret turned out to be a group called BLAC. Bard announced that he and Michelsen would continue to tour and would release new Stereo Skyline songs, along with continuing with their planned Brazil tour. On August 11, 2011, the band released the single "Kiss Me in the Morning" from what Stereo Skyline announced on its official Facebook page would be an album titled The Good Life.

Michelsen left the band before the release of The Good Life and the Brazil tour. Bard brought back Purpura and friends Larzz Principato and Ryan Forsythe to fill out the touring line-up. They appeared in Brazil on MTV Brasil while on tour there.

Members

Former members
Kevin Bard - lead vocals, guitar (2006–December 31, 2011)
Tom Angenbroich - bass, screaming vocals (2006–2007)
Eddie Dizura - guitar (2006)
Clayton Johnson - guitar, backing vocals (April 26, 2010-May 21, 2011)
Brian Maddox - bass (2008–May 21, 2011)
Dane Milanovic - drums (2006)
Jay Marotta - guitar, bass (2006-November 2008)
Rob Michelsen - drums (2007–2011)
Anthony Purpura - synthesizer, drums, bass (2006–2007)
Matt Villani - vocals, piano, synthesizer, guitar (2006-September 2008)

Former touring members
Ryan Forsythe - bass (2011)
Cal Knapp - guitar (2009)
Clayton Johnson - guitar, backing vocals (January 2010-April 26, 2010)
Brian Maddox - bass (2008–2011) 
Larzz Principato - guitar (2011)
Anthony Purpura - drums (2011)

Discography

Albums
Stuck On Repeat (July 20, 2010) U.S. No. 133
The Good Life (November 1, 2011)

EPs
The Worst Case Scenario (September 24, 2006)
Stereo Skyline - EP (July 16, 2008)

Singles
"Heartbeat" (2010)
"Tongue Tied" (2010)
"Me and You" (2010)
"Kiss Me In the Morning" (2011)

References

Musical groups established in 2006
Musical groups from Long Island
Columbia Records artists
Pop punk groups from New York (state)